"Pardon my French" is a common English-language expression. 

Pardon my French may also refer to:

 Pardon My French (Fuck album), 1997
 Pardon My French (Chunk! No, Captain Chunk! album), 2013
 Pardon My French (1921 film), a silent film starring Ralph Yearsley
 Pardon My French (1951 film) or The Lady from Boston, a film starring Paul Henreid and Merle Oberon
 Pardon My French (collective),  a team by DJ Snake with Tchami, Mercer and Malaa

See also
 Excuse My French (disambiguation)